Ronald "Ron" C. Crane (June 1, 1950 - June 19, 2017) was an American electrical engineer recognized for designing the EtherLink, the first network interface controller for the IBM PC.  He has been credited as the co-founder of 3Com and the co-inventor of the Ethernet.

Biography
Crane graduated from the Massachusetts Institute of Technology for his bachelor's degree in 1972 and from Stanford University for his master's degree in 1974, both in electrical engineering. In 1973, while pursuing his doctorate degree at Stanford, Crane joined the TCP/IP protocol research team, headed by Vint Cerf.  Subsequently, when a "Birth of the Internet" plaque was installed on Stanford grounds in 2005, Ron Crane was mentioned as well as his colleague Bob Metcalfe as being fundamental contributors to the birth of the Internet.

Crane left Stanford in 1974, accepting a master's instead of his planned doctorate degree, and worked at the Xerox Systems Development Division, a spinoff of Xerox PARC, where he was responsible for enhancing the original Ethernet transmission system.  Crane joined Robert Metcalfe at 3Com as the fourth employee and co-founder in 1979.  It was here at 3Com that Crane developed the 3C100, the first Thick Ethernet transceiver for the IBM PC, which went on to be the first major product offered by 3Com.

Crane founded LAN Media Corporation in 1992.  It was later acquired by SBE Incorporated in 2000, which was in turn acquired by Neonode in 2007.

In 2006, Crane endowed a professorship at MIT to support energy-related research.

Crane died on June 19, 2017, from complications of an aggressive form of prostate cancer.  A memorial event was held at The Computer History Museum and attended by over 100 esteemed colleagues, friends, and family.  Bob Metcalfe gave the closing speech.

In 2019 a book entitled "The 3Com story" was published, that in part documents Crane's contributions to networking and 3Com. 

For more information of Ron C. Crane's technical accomplishments please visit:
https://www.ithistory.org/honor-roll/mr-ron-c-crane

https://www.sigcis.org/node/627

https://ethernethistory.typepad.com/my_weblog/2017/08/in-memory-of-ron-crane.html#comments

References

American electrical engineers
Internet pioneers
MIT School of Engineering alumni
Stanford University School of Engineering alumni
Scientists at PARC (company)
1950 births
2017 deaths